Judaism Unbound is a podcast hosted by Daniel Libenson and Lex Rofeberg that discusses Judaism in the 21st century.

Background 
Libenson began to do research for a book and after Rofeberg joined him as an assistant they decided to turn it into a podcast. Libenson and Rofeberg analyze Judaism in the context of the 21st century while interviewing experts and regular Jewish people. Libenson claims that the traditional methods of engaging people with Judaism alienates American Jews and that digital mediums such as podcasts and online teaching can be used to address that problem. Libenson is the founder and president of the Institute for the Next Jewish Future, which is the provider of the podcast. Libenson is the son of Eli Libenson, a Conservative rabbi, who left Manetto Hill Jewish Center and made aliyah when Dan was only 14 years old. Despite the fact that both of Rofeberg's parents were attorneys he decided to pursue religion instead of law. Rofeberg grew up in Shorewood Wisconsin before becoming a rabbinical student at the Alliance for Jewish Renewal and later attending Brown University.

Format 
The podcast releases episodes on a weekly basis. The show's format was originally based on tech podcasts like This Week In Tech and Future Tense and focused on interviewing well known Jewish leaders such as Benay Lappe, Noam Sienna, and Lori Schneide Shapiro

Episodes

Season 1 (2016)

Reception 
In April 2019, the podcast had over 200 episodes and one million downloads. The show was the seventh most popular Jewish podcast on iTunes with episodes receiving between 40,000 and 50,000 downloads every month. The show hosted a live, online episode to celebrate.

The hosts did interviews with the New Voices and The Jewish Chronicle.

References

External links 

 
 

Audio podcasts
2016 podcast debuts
Religion and spirituality podcasts
American podcasts
Jewish podcasts